Simon Thompson may refer to:

Simon Thompson (businessman)
Simon Thompson (footballer) a Scarborough F.C. player
Simon Thompson (make-up artist)
Simon Thompson (professor)
Simon Thompson (Royal Mail), CEO of Royal Mail
Simon Thompson (triathlete)

See also
 Simone Thompson (born 1996), American model known as Slick Woods